Top-seed Jimmy Connors claimed the title and first prize money of $25,000 by defeating third-seeded Guillermo Vilas in the final.

Seeds
A champion seed is indicated in bold text while text in italics indicates the round in which that seed was eliminated.

  Jimmy Connors (champion)
  John McEnroe (semifinals)
  Guillermo Vilas (final)
  José Higueras (semifinals)
  José Luis Clerc (quarterfinals)
  Gene Mayer (first round)
  Wojciech Fibak (third round)
  Manuel Orantes (quarterfinals)
  Eliot Teltscher (third round)
  Balázs Taróczy (third round)
  Corrado Barazzutti (quarterfinals)
  Tomáš Šmíd (third round)
  Ivan Lendl (quarterfinals)
  Peter Feigl (first round)
  Chris Lewis (second round)
  Peter McNamara (third round)

Draw

Finals

Top half

Section 1

Section 2

Bottom half

Section 3

Section 4

References

External links

U.S. Clay Court Championships
1979 U.S. Clay Court Championships